LBL can mean:
 Laidback Luke, Dutch Music Producer/DJ 
 Lawrence Berkeley National Laboratory, formerly Lawrence Berkeley Laboratory
 Liberal Mid-America Regional Airport, IATA code LBL
 Long base line sonar
 Latvian Basketball League
 Landsforeningen for Bøsser og Lesbiske, former name of LGBT Danmark
 Layer by layer, a thin film fabrication technique
 Layer by Layer, a Rubik's cube solving technique
 Liège–Bastogne–Liège, a one-day classic cycling race in Belgium
 London Borough of Lambeth
 London Borough of Lewisham